The Gedamsa Caldera is a 7 x 9 km caldera in the Main Ethiopian Rift valley. There are small basaltic spatter cones and fumarolic activity inside the caldera floor along with a series of (Late Pleistocene to Holocene) rhyolite and pumice deposits and a Holocene lava dome/flow.

References

Volcanoes of Ethiopia
Calderas of Ethiopia